Cremorne is a suburb on the Lower North Shore of Sydney, New South Wales, Australia, located 6 kilometres north-east of the Sydney central business district, in the local government area of North Sydney Council.

Cremorne Junction is a locality within the suburb. Immediately adjacent to the suburb, to the south, is the small residential suburb of Cremorne Point. Cremorne is situated between Mosman and Neutral Bay.

History

Aboriginal culture
Prior to the arrival of the First Fleet, the area in which Cremorne is situated was inhabited by the Cam-mer-ray-gal group of the Ku-ring-gai Aboriginal nation. The group, which inhabited the north shore of Port Jackson, was one of the largest in the Sydney area.

European settlement
Cremorne was named after the Cremorne Gardens in London, a popular pleasure ground in England, which derived its name from the Old Irish words Crích Mugdornd (modern Irish: Críoch Mhúrn), meaning 'boundary' or 'chieftain' of Mugdornd.<ref>https://web.archive.org/web/20130501212105/http://about.nsw.gov.au/view/suburb/Cremorne/%27%27</ref> Cremorne, the Anglicisation of the Gaelic name Críoch Mhúrn, roughly meaning the 'Bounds of Mourne', was a barony in County Monaghan from which an Irish peer, The 1st Viscount Cremorne, took his title. Lord Cremorne gave his name to his London residence in what became the Cremorne Gardens. Other sources claim that rather than referring to a Chieftain, it refers to the territorial area of an ancient tribal group in County Monaghan. The Cremorne Gardens, Sydney, were established on the peninsula leading to Robertson Point in 1856, following the Cremorne Gardens, Melbourne, in 1853, just two of many such developments throughout Australia from the mid-nineteenth to early twentieth century. Although the Gardens closed in 1862, they gave their name both to the suburb at their location at Cremorne Point and to the suburb of Cremorne itself to the north.

 Heritage listings 
Cremorne has a number of heritage-listed sites on the New South Wales State Heritage Register (SHR) and the North Sydney Local Environmental Plan 2013 (LEP), including:
 8 Bannerman Street: Dalkeith Property (SHR & LEP)
 7 Cranbrook Avenue: Belvedere (Cremorne) (SHR & LEP)
 11 Cranbrook Avenue: Egglemont (SHR & LEP)
 274 Military Road: SCEGGS Redlands (LEP)
 380 Military Road: Hayden Orpheum Picture Palace (LEP)
 53-57 Murdoch Street: Cremorne Girls High School (Former) (LEP)

Commercial area
Cremorne is a mainly residential area with its commercial area centred along Military Road, around Cremorne Junction. Cremorne has a supermarket, a high-rise hotel known as Park Regis Concierge Apartments and a number of restaurants and shops. The Cremorne Town Centre includes the Cremorne Hotel. The commercial zone is smaller than neighbouring Neutral Bay. Small companies lease office space in this area.

Cremorne features a historic cinema, the Hayden Orpheum Picture Palace. In an Art Deco style, it features a Wurlitzer pipe-organ that is played at selected film screenings. The cinema was designed by G. N. Kenworthy and constructed in 1935 by Angelo Virgona. Its restoration was undertaken in 1987 by its new owner, television personality Mike Walsh.

Demographics
At the 2016 census, there were 11,227 residents in Cremorne. Of these:
 56.0% of people were born in Australia. The most common other countries of birth were England 7.2%, New Zealand 3.1%, China 2.3%, South Africa 1.8% and Japan 1.8%. The most common ancestries in Cremorne were English 25.8%, Australian 16.6%, Irish 10.2%, Scottish 7.4% and Chinese 5.2%.  72.5% of people only spoke English at home. Other languages spoken at home included Mandarin 2.6%, Japanese 2.1%, Cantonese 2.0%, Spanish 1.5% and French 1.1%.
 The median weekly household income was $2,348, significantly higher than the national median income of $1,438.
 The residents were a similar spread of ages to the rest of Australia; their median age was 38 years, the same as the median for the rest of the country.  Children aged under 15 years made up 14.9% of the population (national average is 18.7%) and people aged 65 years and over made up 15.7% of the population (national average is 15.8%).
 The most common responses for religion were No Religion 35.2%, Catholic 22.5%, Anglican 15.4%.
 The average household held only 2.1 people.

Schools
A co-educational private school, SCECGS Redlands, has its senior campus in Military Road and its junior and middle campus in Murdoch Street.

Housing

Cremorne is predominantly a residential area, with a wide variety of architectural styles. Federation styles are common. The California Bungalow style is also represented. The most outstanding example is Belvedere, in Cranbrook Avenue. An example of the larger California style, Belvedere'' was designed by Alexander Stewart Jolly and built in 1919. It has heritage listings at both state and federal levels.

Churches

 St Peter's Anglican Church: this church in Waters Road was built 1909–10. The architect was Ernest Albert Scott. The parish had existed as an independent entity since 1908.

Transport
All transport to and from Cremorne is by road or water. Military Road connects Cremorne to Neutral Bay and the Sydney Harbour Bridge to the west, and to Mosman to the east.

Transport between Military Road and Sydney CBD is available via Keolis Downer Northern Beaches routes such as 100, 151, 169, 178, 243, 244, 245, 247 and E69. Other bus routes on Military Road provide regular services to the business districts in North Sydney, Chatswood and the Northern Beaches. The Sydney Ferries Mosman route runs between Cremorne's two wharves, Cremorne Point and Old Cremorne, and Circular Quay.

Gallery

References

 
Suburbs of Sydney